Park Crescent may refer to:

 Park Crescent, Brighton, England
 Park Crescent, London, England
 Park Crescent, Worthing, England